The 1960 Minor States Carnival was an edition of the lower division of Australian National Football Carnival, an Australian rules football interstate competition. The previous minor states carnival had been held as part of the 1958 Melbourne Carnival. The competition was won by the Victorian Football Association.

The minor states carnival was played in two parts:
A round-robin competition was held in Sydney between 25 June and 3 July amongst the Victorian Football Association – which was relegated from Division 1 at the 1958 Melbourne Carnival – New South Wales, Queensland and Canberra.
A playoff match for promotion to the top division was then played in Canberra between the Australian Amateurs – which had won Division 2 of the 1958 Melbourne Carnival – and the winner of the round robin.

Results

References

Australian rules interstate football
Minor States Carnival, 1960